Nicotiana is the genus of herbs and shrubs which is cultivated to produce tobacco products.

Tobacco is an agricultural product processed from the fresh leaves of plants in the genus Nicotiana.

Tobacco may also refer to:

Actions 

 Chipper (tobacco)
 Smoking pipe (tobacco)
 Tobacco bowdlerization
 Tobacco harm reduction
 Tobacco rings
 Tobacco smoking
 Usages of tobacco

Tobacco

Types 

 Burley (tobacco)
 Criollo tobacco
 Latakia (tobacco)
 Turkish tobacco

Products 

 Cavendish Tobacco
 Chewing tobacco
 Cigarette card
 Dipping tobacco
 Kodiak tobacco
 Queen's Tobacco-pipe
 Shag (tobacco)
 Smokeless tobacco
 Snuff
 Snus
 Tobacco barn
 Y1 (tobacco)

Pathogens 

 Satellite Tobacco Mosaic Virus
 Tobacco etch virus
 Tobacco leaf curl virus
 Tobacco mosaic virus
 Tobacco necrosis virus
 Tobacco ringspot virus
 Tobacco streak virus
 Tobacco stunt virus
 Tobacco vein mottling virus

Legal

Legislation 

 Tobacco Damages and Health Care Costs Recovery Act
 Tobacco Master Settlement Agreement
 Tobacco packaging warning messages
 Tobacco Products Control Act

Court cases 

 FDA v. Brown & Williamson Tobacco Corp.
 Imperial Tobacco v. British Columbia
 The Cherokee tobacco case
 United States v. American Tobacco Co.

Agreements 

 Tobacco litigation
 Tobacco lobby
 Tobacco Lords

Movements

Culture 

 Legacy Tobacco Documents Library Multimedia Collection

Campaigns 

 Tobacco Protest
 Anti-tobacco movement in Nazi Germany
 Smoking ban
 Tobacco advertising
 Tobacco Advertising and Promotion Act 2002
 Tobacco cessation clinic
 World Health Organization Framework Convention on Tobacco Control

Education 

 Drug, Alcohol, and Tobacco Education

Names

Brands 

 Drum (tobacco)
 Oliver Twist Tobacco
 Prince Albert (tobacco)
 Skoal tobacco

Businesses 

 Altadis
 Altria Group
 American Tobacco Company
 Bloch Brothers Tobacco Company
 British American Tobacco
 Brown & Williamson
 China National Tobacco Co.
 Donskoy Tabak
 Fortune Tobacco
 Imperial Tobacco
 Iranian Tobacco Company
 Japan Tobacco
 KT&G
 Liggett Group
 Lorillard Tobacco Company
 Mac Baren
 Republic Tobacco
 R. J. Reynolds Tobacco Company
 Reemtsma
 Santa Fe Natural Tobacco Company
 Scandinavian Tobacco Group
 SEITA
 Tabacalera
 Tabaqueira
 Taiwan Tobacco and Liquor Corporation
 Tekel
 Tobacco Institute
 Tobacco Radio Network
 U.S. Smokeless Tobacco Company
 Vector Tobacco
 W. T. Blackwell and Company Tobacco Factory

Persons 

 Louis Tobacco
 Old Tobacco
 Young Tobacco
 Tobacco (musician)

Locations 

 Bakery, Confectionery, Tobacco Workers and Grain Millers' International Union
 Duke Homestead and Tobacco Factory
 Mail Pouch Tobacco Barn
 Model Tobacco Building
 Northern Wisconsin Co-op Tobacco Pool Warehouse
 Port Tobacco Village, Maryland
 Rose Hill (Port Tobacco, Maryland)
 Sarajevo Tobacco Factory
 Stanley Dock Tobacco Warehouse
 Tobacco Bay (Bermuda)
 Tobacco Dock
 Tobacco Garden Creek
 Tobacco Road (disambiguation)
 Tobacco Root Mountains
 Tobacco Row
 Tobacco Township, Michigan

Organizations 

 Canadian Council for Tobacco Control
 Delaware Division of Alcohol and Tobacco Enforcement
 Florida Division of Alcoholic Beverages and Tobacco
 Georgia Alcohol and Tobacco Division
 Indiana Alcohol and Tobacco Commission
 Lakson Group
 Maryland Alcohol and Tobacco Tax Bureau
 Oxford Tobacco Research Station
 Thailand Tobacco Monopoly FC
 Youth Tobacco Cessation Collaborative

Other 
 Iwan Ries and Co.
 Tobacco Road (novel)
 Tobacco (tribe)
 Tobacco Plains Indian Band

See also 
 Big Tobacco
 Bureau of Alcohol, Tobacco, Firearms and Explosives
 History of commercial tobacco in the United States
 List of countries by tobacco consumption per capita
 Plantation economy
 Nicotine
 Smoking
 Tar (tobacco residue)
 Tobacco and health
 Tobacco and other drugs
 Prevalence of tobacco usage

 List
Tobacco
Tobacco